is a railway station in the city of Iiyama, Nagano Prefecture, Japan operated by East Japan Railway Company (JR East). Its name is also written "Togarinozawa Onsen Station".

Lines
Togari-Nozawaonsen Station is served by the Iiyama Line, and is 27.5 kilometers from the starting point of the line at Toyono Station.

Station layout
The station consists of one island platform connected to the station building by a level crossing. The station has a Midori no Madoguchi staffed ticket office.

Platforms

History
It was renamed to its present name on 1 March 1987. With the privatization of Japanese National Railways (JNR) on 1 April 1987, the station came under the control of JR East.

Passenger statistics
In fiscal 2017, the station was used by an average of 148 passengers daily (boarding passengers only).

Surrounding area
Chikuma River

Nozawa Onsen and Ski Resort

See also
 List of railway stations in Japan

References

External links

 JR East station information 

Railway stations in Nagano Prefecture
Iiyama Line
Railway stations in Japan opened in 1923
Iiyama, Nagano